Atlanta blues refers to the local blues  scene in Atlanta, Georgia, United States, which had its heyday in the 1920s and 1930s. According to AllMusic,"The Atlanta blues scene of the 1920s was among the most fertile in all the South, with a steady stream of rural musicians converging on the city hoping to gain exposure playing the local club circuit, with any luck rising to perform at Decatur Street's famed 81 Theatre."

The oldest representative of the Atlanta blues was Peg Leg Howell, who made his first recordings in 1926. He was followed by Blind Willie McTell, Barbecue Bob, Charley Lincoln and Curley Weaver, with McTell typically being the most popular and acclaimed.

Many of these musicians banded together into groups; the most popular of these bands were The Georgia Cotton Pickers.

Cora Mae Bryant, the daughter of Curley Weaver, gradually became important on the Atlanta blues scene; performing, organizing "Giving It Back" festivals at the city's Northside Tavern to honor early blues artists, and as a frequent caller to local blues radio shows. Also, Bryant's knowledge of early blues in Atlanta and Georgia, was used as a source by the music historians Peter B. Lowry and Bruce Bastin.

More modern blues performers that have come out of or near Atlanta include Delta Moon, and Chick Willis.

Notable performers
 Barbecue Bob
 Peg Leg Howell
 Charley Lincoln
 Eddie Mapp 
 Fred McMullen
 Blind Willie McTell
 Buddy Moss
 Curley Weaver 
 Bumble Bee Slim
 George Carter (musician)
 Andrew and Jim Baxter
 Kokomo Arnold
 Ed Andrews (blues musician)
 Tampa Red
 Too Tight Henry

References

External links
 "Southern Blues" in "Acoustic Guitar Magazine"

Music of Atlanta